The Montenegrin First League of Water Polo is the national professional water polo league in Montenegro. It was established in 2006. shortly after Montenegro declared its independence from Serbia and Montenegro. It is organized by the Water Polo and Swimming Federation of Montenegro. 
Three clubs from Montenegrin League are playing in Adriatic Water Polo League.

History

Before independence
During their history, Montenegrin water polo clubs played in the top-tier competition of SFR Yugoslavia, FR Yugoslavia and Serbia and Montenegro, with important roles in Yugoslav Water Polo Championship. Among them are PVK Jadran, VK Primorac Kotor and VK Budva.
In that competitions, Montenegrin clubs won 6 titles of national champion. First time, PVK Jadran became champion of Yugoslavia on season 1957-58. Next year, Jadran defended the trophy. VK Primorac won their first champion title on 1985-86 season. On season 1993-94, champion of Yugoslavia became VK Budva. After two trophies in 50's, PVK Jadran won four champion titles on 2002-03, 2003–04, 2004–05 and 2005-06.
Below is the list of Montenegrin clubs' champion titles in the First League of Yugoslavia.

After independence
Soon after the Montenegrin independence referendum, Water polo Federation of Montenegro founded its own competitions, with the First League as a top-tier competition. Number of teams in the First League varied - from 4 to 8.
All the titles in Montenegrin League won three teams - Jadran, Primorac and Budva. Montenegrin clubs are participants of Adriatic Water polo League, too, from its first season.

Champions 
From the inaugural season (2006-07), three different clubs won champion titles in Montenegrin First League of Water Polo.

Titles by season

Titles by Club

Montenegrin League 
Below is a list of clubs with titles won in Montenegrin First League of Water Polo.

Overall 
Below is an overall list, with titles won in both leagues - Montenegrin League and SFR Yugoslavia / Serbia and Montenegro Championship.

Montenegrin water polo clubs in Adriatic League
Clubs from Montenegro were among the founders of Adriatic Water Polo League, which is established at 2008. Since its first season, Montenegrin sides were among the most successful participants of regional competition, and PVK Jadran Herceg Novi won two titles. Othed clubs from Montenegro which participated in Adriatic League are VK Primorac Kotor, VK Budva and VA Cattaro Kotor.
Below is list of participation of Montenegrin clubs by every season of Adriatic League.

Montenegrin water polo clubs in European competitions

Montenegrin water polo clubs are participating in the LEN competitions since the season 1986-97. 
First team which ever competed at the European cups was VK Primorac Kotor. Except them, in LEN competitions played also PVK Jadran Herceg Novi, VK Budva, VA Cattaro Kotor and PVK Val Prčanj.
Biggest success in the history of Montenegrin waterpolo made VK Primorac, who won the title in LEN Champions League 2009. Except them, another Montenegrin holder of European trophy is VA Cattaro.
Among the titles which Montenegrin teams won in LEN competitions are:
LEN Champions League:
VK Primorac Kotor: 2009
LEN Cup:
VA Cattaro Kotor: 2010
During the overall history, five different Montenegrin clubs played in LEN competitions.

As of the end of LEN competitions 2015–16 season.

See also
 Adriatic Water polo League
 Montenegrin Second League of Water Polo
 Montenegrin Water Polo Cup

References

External links 
Water Polo and Swimming Federation of Montenegro

First League
Montenegro
Sports leagues in Montenegro